Teri York (born 11 November 1955) is a Canadian diver.

York competed at the 1972 Summer Olympics in the 3 metre springboard event and at the 1976 Summer Olympics in the 3 metre springboard event where she finished 14th and in the 10 metre platform event where she finished 6th.

She won a bronze medal at the 1974 British Commonwealth Games in the 3 metres springboard event.

References

External links

1955 births
Living people
Divers from Winnipeg
Olympic divers of Canada
Divers at the 1972 Summer Olympics
Divers at the 1976 Summer Olympics
Divers at the 1974 British Commonwealth Games
Canadian female divers
Commonwealth Games bronze medallists for Canada
Commonwealth Games medallists in diving
20th-century Canadian women
Medallists at the 1974 British Commonwealth Games